The 2004 Catalan motorcycle Grand Prix was the fifth round of the 2004 MotoGP Championship. It took place on the weekend of 11–13 June 2004 at the Circuit de Catalunya located in Montmeló, Catalonia, Spain.

This race saw the last non-factory rider to lead the championship before Cal Crutchlow in the 2018 Argentine Grand Prix.

MotoGP classification

250 cc classification

125 cc classification

Championship standings after the race (motoGP)

Below are the standings for the top five riders and constructors after round five has concluded.

Riders' Championship standings

Constructors' Championship standings

 Note: Only the top five positions are included for both sets of standings.

References

Catalan motorcycle Grand Prix
Catalan
Catalan Motorcycle Grand Prix
motorcycle